Pere d'Urtx was Bishop of Urgell from 1269 to 1293. He became the first Episcopal Co-Prince of Andorra when he signed the paréage establishing joint-sovereignty over the territory with Roger-Bernard III, Count of Foix in 1278.

The paréage ended almost a century of conflict over the territory between successive Bishops of Urgell, on the one hand, and Viscounts of Castellbò and Counts of Foix, on the other, and effectively established the modern state of Andorra.

External links
 Bisbat d'Urgell: Pere d'Urtx 

1293 deaths
13th-century Princes of Andorra
Bishops of Urgell
13th-century Roman Catholic bishops in the Kingdom of Aragon
Year of birth missing